Greenview is a rural locality in the South Burnett Region, Queensland, Australia. In the  Greenview had a population of 93 people.

History 
Greenview Provisional School opened in July 1905. On 1 January 1909 it became Greenview State School. It closed in 1935. It re-opened in 1948  and finally closed in 1973. It was located at 696 Tingoora Chelmsford Road.

In the  Greenview had a population of 93 people.

References 

South Burnett Region
Localities in Queensland